Heather Ogden is a Canadian ballet dancer. She is a principal dancer at the National Ballet of Canada.

Early life
Ogden was born in Toronto, Ontario. She and her family moved to Richmond, British Columbia when she was 6. After seeing her babysitter dance, Ogden started training at the Richmond Academy of Dance. She graduated in 1998.

Career
In 1998, Ogden joined the National Ballet of Canada as an apprentice, and was promoted to the corps de ballet the following year.
 Ogden was named Principal Dancer in 2005. She has danced principal roles in productions such as Swan Lake, Romeo and Juliet, The Sleeping Beauty and Cinderella.

Reviewing her performance as Princess Aurora in The Sleeping Beauty, The Globe and Mail called her performance "jaw-dropping. Without so much as a wobble, she seemed to hang in the air for an eternity." On Nijinsky, The Globe and Mail called Ogden's dancing "full of tenderness and pathos" as her character's "marriage (and her husband's mind) falls apart later on."

Outside of the National Ballet, Ogden has also made guest appearances with The Suzanne Farrell Ballet, Stuttgart Ballet, Hamburg Ballet, Munich Ballet and multiple galas. In 2014, she became an ambassador for Rolex Canada.

Ogden was featured in 2013 short film Lost In Motion II.

Selected repertoire

Odette-Odile in Swan Lake
Princess Aurora in The Sleeping Beauty
Juliet in Romeo and Juliet
Sugar Plum Fairy in The Nutcracker
Romola in Nijinsky
Hanna Glawari in The Merry Widow

Cinderella and Fairy Godmother in Cinderella
Hermione in The Winter’s Tale
Alice in Alice’s Adventures in Wonderland
Anna Karenina in Anna Karenina
Carmen in Carmen

Personal life
In 2010, Ogden married fellow National Ballet principal dancer Guillaume Côté. The couple has two children.

Ogden grew up playing softball, but gave up to focus on ballet. In 2017, she threw a ceremonial first pitch at a Toronto Blue Jays baseball game.

References

External links
Interview with Guillaume Côté and Heather Ogden by The Poetry Extension

External links
Heather Ogden - National Ballet of Canada profile

Living people
Canadian ballerinas
National Ballet of Canada principal dancers
People from Toronto
1980s births
Canadian female dancers
21st-century ballet dancers
21st-century Canadian dancers
Prima ballerinas